Russell Floyd (born 29 May 1962 in Croydon, London, England) is a British actor. After graduating from RADA, he played Rick in 3 episodes of London's Burning as firefighter Sally Reid's swimming instructor. He also played Bridge Street Market Inspector Michael Rose in the BBC soap opera EastEnders from 1996 to 1999, and DC Ken Drummond in the ITV police drama, The Bill, from 2002 to 2005. He also played a detective in the Sky One football drama, Dream Team in 2005, he appeared in the BBC medical drama Doctors in 2006 and 2010 (unrelated roles). He also starred in the BBC drama, Casualty in 2007, he has also done some voice acting of Wardrobe one of The Snow Queen's evil troll servants in The Snow Queen and The Snow Queen's Revenge.

He has appeared in two plays in 2009 – Maggies End at the Shaw Theatre in London (April), and The Bullet at The Open House, Brighton (May).

He then went on to become a substitute teacher at Bexhill High School. He is also a substitute teacher for Felpham Community College, Reigate School and other local high schools.

He played Don Arden in All or Nothing the Mod Musical, which toured the UK, in 2016 & 2017

He lives in Brighton with his wife Lucie and has two children, Gabriel and Zara.

External links 

1962 births
English male soap opera actors
Living people